Jason Piggie (born 23 January 1971 in Kansas City, Missouri), is an American filmmaker and photographer, writer, and director. Piggie, who got his start in a high school photography class, captures images of everyday life, preferring his art "without enhanced manipulation." Piggie is the owner of a production company in Kansas City, Little Piggie Entertainment. Piggie received the first place award at the 3/5/7 Film Festival in the 5-minute category in 2009. In 2012, Piggie won best in show at an Arts KC show. Piggie is a member of the African American Artists Collective in Kansas City, which was recently awarded a Charlotte Street StartUp Residency.

References 

Living people
People from Kansas City, Missouri
American film directors
American photographers
1971 births